Delaware Water Gap is a water gap on the border of the U.S. states of New Jersey and Pennsylvania where the Delaware River cuts through a large ridge of the Appalachian Mountains.

The gap makes up the southern portion of the Delaware Water Gap National Recreation Area, which is used primarily for recreational purposes, such as canoeing, fishing, hiking, and rock climbing. Though the US National Park Service manages the National Recreation Area, portions of the water gap are also patrolled by New Jersey Division of Parks and Forestry.

The Park does not charge an entrance fee but does have expanded amenity fees, including vehicle season and daily passes, bicycles amenity fees, and charges for beach use. Most of the park is open 24-hours a day, with most day-use areas within the park open sunrise to sunset (such as trailhead parking lots, Millbrook Village, and all picnic areas).

Geology

A water gap is a geological feature where a river cuts through a mountain ridge. The Delaware Water Gap formed 500 million years ago when quartz pebbles from mountains in the area were deposited in a shallow sea. The Martinsburg Shale on the eastern side of what was to be Kittatinny Mountain was uplifted 450 million years ago when a chain of volcanic islands collided with proto-North America. These islands slid over the North American plate, and deposited rock on top of the plate, forming the Highlands and Kittatinny Valley.

About 400 million years ago, a small continent collided with proto-North America. The heat from the pressure melted the quartzite, which allowed it to bend the quartz pebbles. This layer was then uplifted and cracked over thousands of years. During this period, the Delaware River slowly cut its path down through the shattered and cracked quartzite. If the quartzite had not been cracked, the river would not have been able to cut its path through the mountain to form the gap.

Millions of years of rain, ice, snow, and wind erosion shaped the area. The Wisconsin glaciation, which occurred between 21,000 B.C. and 13,000 B.C., covered the entire Kittatinny Ridge and ended near Belvidere. When the glaciers retreated, the existing gap assumed its present form.

The mountain is comprised of Silurian shawangunk conglomerate. This is gray quartzite, which makes the mountain highly resistant to weathering. The Silurian High Fall formation of sandstone is on the western side of the gap near the base. The eastern side of the gap has Ordovician Martinsburg shale. Sedimentary rock is along the river. The Bloomsburg Red Beds, a red shale, are at the gap under Dunnfield Creek.

The river through the gap is 290 feet above sea level.

The ridge of the Appalachians that the Delaware crosses is called the Blue Mountains in Pennsylvania and the Kittatinny Ridge in New Jersey. This is the first major ridge of the Appalachian mountains. New Jersey's mountain is Mount Tammany, named after the Lenni-Lenape Chief Tamanend. The Pennsylvania mountain is Mount Minsi, named after the Native American tribe of the area.

Flora and fauna
In 1739, America's first botanist, John Bartram of Philadelphia, followed the course of the Delaware River in his search for American trees, evergreens and shrubs to supply new species that were formerly unknown to British naturalists. These gardeners waited months for shipments of saplings, seeds, and pinecones to be sent by sea that were then introduced into English gardens. Using Native American trails, Bartram rode on horseback through the Water Gap, which allowed entry to the lands beyond.

A northern deciduous forest cloaks the slopes of the Delaware Water Gap. Hardwood species comprising the forest include various oaks, hickories, maples, ash, elm, cherry, walnut, birch, sycamore, and beech. Coniferous species include Eastern White Pine, Pitch Pine, Eastern Red Cedar, and Eastern Hemlock.

Black bear, white-tailed deer, gray squirrels, red squirrels, raccoons, gray fox, fisher, and chipmunks are some of the forest species of the area. Hunting of deer, turkey, and small game is permitted, following NJ Fish & Wildlife regulations, but is not permitted at any of the campsites.

Shad migrate up the river through the gap in the spring. Other fish include bass, trout, carp, and walleye. Dunnfield Creek has been designated a "Wild Trout Stream" because of its natural brook trout fishery.

Timber rattlesnakes and copperheads also inhabit the rocky areas of the mountain. Salamanders are found in the moist areas of the forest. Eastern prickly pear cactus also grows on the mountain near the red dot trail on the south eastern facing slope halfway up the mountain.

Transportation

Steep rock walls prohibited foot travel through the gap until a road was built on the Pennsylvania side of the river in 1793. In 1830, a road was built on the New Jersey side through the gap and north toward Pahaquarry. Interstate 80 passes through the gap on the New Jersey side as of the early 1970s via the Delaware Water Gap Toll Bridge, and occupies the former right-of-way of the New York, Susquehanna and Western Railway.

The Pennsylvania portion of the New Jersey Cut-Off mainline of the Delaware, Lackawanna and Western Railroad comes into Slateford, Pennsylvania. The Pennsylvania Northeast Regional Railroad Authority owns the trackage in the Water Gap area. Delaware-Lackawanna Railroad operates the lines that run through the gap. Pennsylvania Route 611 occupies the right-of-way of a former trolley line.

Tocks Island and the National Park Service
In 1962, Congress authorized the building of a dam across the Delaware River at Tocks Island, upstream of the water gap. Meant to control hurricane-related flooding, it was never built. The land for the proposed reservoir, which had already been purchased, was used to create the Delaware Water Gap National Recreation Area in 1965.

There are two visitor centers, one in New Jersey near the Delaware River bridge and the other in Dingman's Ferry, Pennsylvania. Headquarters is located on River Road in Pennsylvania. The New Jersey side of the gap is also protected within Worthington State Forest, a forest wholly contained within the recreation area.

Hiking trails

Mount Tammany Trail
One of two trails leading up 1,200 vertical feet to the summit of Mt. Tammany. Once completed, one can see views of Mt. Minsi in Pennsylvania on the other side of the gap.

Pahaquarry Trail
The second trail to the top of Mt. Tammany. The most challenging hike in the park is to combine the Red Dot and Blue Blaze trails into a  loop. Park Services suggest ascending the Red Dot and descending the Blue Blaze, and the Blue trail is less steep.

Dunnfield Creek Trail
Dunnfield Creek Trail departs from the Appalachian Trail above the Delaware River, follows the creek for two-thirds of its length with numerous stream crossings. The trail then climbs a ravine to rejoin the Appalachian Trail at Sunfish Pond.

Appalachian Trail

Running from Springer Mountain, Georgia to Mt. Katahdin in Baxter State Park, Maine, the Appalachian Trail enters the Delaware Water Gap at the Delaware River on the Route 80 Bridge. It goes to Sunfish Pond, and continues northeast to Stokes State Forest. The trail crosses Route 206 and continues along the ridgeline of the Kittatinny Mountains to High Point State Park, eventually entering New York.

Additional trails also traverse through the area.

Rock climbing
The gap is a popular place to rock-climb in New Jersey. Most climbing is done on the New Jersey side due to easier access. There are about one hundred climbs on the New Jersey side. Climbs range from 5.1 to 5.14 on the Yosemite Decimal System scale. Climbers follow the gray dot trail along Route 80, then passing the large rock face on Route 80. They then go up the path to the route they choose.

In recent years, the Pennsylvania side has been closed to climbing during the nesting season for peregrine falcons; this has resulted in overgrowth of trails and climbing routes, providing an experience closer to the natural state than is found at more popular climbing destinations.

Boy Scout camps
The Easton Area Council of the Boy Scouts of America operated Weygadt Scout Reservation at the base of Mount Tammany from 1931 until 1968.<ref
 name="nps">NPS.GOV - History of the Delaware Watergap</ref> The Reservation was originally home to two Scout camps—the Easton Council's Camp Weygadt on the southern part of the reservation and the Bethlehem Area Council's Camp Minsi on the northern section of the reservation.<ref
 name="nps"/><ref
 name="weygadt"></ref> In the later part of the 1930s, the Bethlehem Council moved their camp to the Poconos, and the entire reservation in the Water Gap became Camp Weygadt. Camp Minsi is now located in Pocono Summit, Pennsylvania, on the shores of Stillwater Lake.

Pahaquarra Boy Scout Camp was located on the New Jersey side of the Delaware Water Gap on Old Mine Road at the abandoned Pahaquarry Copper Mine. The camp served Boy Scouts from the George Washington Council. Just north of this camp was Camp Cowaw Boy Scout Camp which served Raritan Council Boy Scouts.

See also
 Mount Tammany Fire Road
 Delaware Water Gap National Recreation Area

References

External links

Camp Cowaw 
Pahaquarry Abandoned Mine at Delaware Water Gap

 
Delaware River

Water gaps of the United States
Landforms of Monroe County, Pennsylvania
Landforms of Northampton County, Pennsylvania
Landforms of Warren County, New Jersey
Geology of New Jersey
Geology of Pennsylvania
Rail mountain passes of the United States
Water gaps of Pennsylvania
Valleys of New Jersey
Geologic formations of New Jersey
Geologic formations of Pennsylvania
Appalachian Trail
Climbing areas of the United States
Tourism regions of New Jersey
Tourist attractions in Monroe County, Pennsylvania
Tourist attractions in Northampton County, Pennsylvania
Interstate 80
National parks of the United States